This is a list of teams that have competed in the League of Legends Championship Series (LCS), the top level of professional League of Legends in North America.

All teams 
 100 Thieves (Spring 2018 – present)
 Apex Gaming (Summer 2016)
 Cloud9 (Summer 2013 – present)
 Clutch Gaming (Spring 2018 – Spring 2020) 
 Team Coast (Summer 2013 – Summer 2015)
 compLexity Gaming (Summer 2014)
 Counter Logic Gaming (Spring 2013 – present)
 Team Curse (Spring 2013 – Summer 2014)
 Dignitas (Spring 2013 – Spring 2016, Spring 2017 – Summer 2017; Summer 2020–present)
 Team Dragon Knights (Summer 2015)
 Echo Fox (Spring 2016 – Summer 2019)
 Enemy eSports (Summer 2015)
 Team Envy (Summer 2016 – Summer 2017)
 Evil Geniuses (Spring 2014 – Summer 2014; Summer 2020-present)
 FlyQuest (Spring 2017 – present)
 Golden Guardians (Spring 2018 – present)
 Good Game University (Spring 2013)
 Gravity Gaming (Spring 2015 – Summer 2015)
 Immortals (Spring 2016 – Summer 2017; Summer 2020-present)
 Team Impulse (Spring 2015 – Spring 2016)
 Team Liquid (Spring 2015 – present)
 LMQ (Summer 2014)
 Team MRN (Spring 2013)
 NRG Esports (Spring 2016 – Summer 2016)
 OpTic Gaming (Spring 2018 – Summer 2019)
 Phoenix1 (Summer 2016 – Summer 2017)
 Renegades (Summer 2015 – Spring 2016)
 Team SoloMid (Spring 2013 – present) 
 Team 8 (Spring 2015 – Summer 2015)
 Velocity eSports (Summer 2014)
 Team Vulcun (Spring 2013 – Summer 2013)
 Winterfox (Spring 2015)
 XDG Gaming (Spring 2014)

Notes

Prior to franchising

2013 Spring 
 Team SoloMid
 Team Curse
 Team Dignitas 
 Counter Logic Gaming 
 Team Vulcun
 Good Game University
 Team MRN 
 compLexity Gaming

2013 Summer 
 Cloud9
 Team Vulcun 
 Team SoloMid
 Team Curse 
 Team Dignitas
 Counter Logic Gaming 
 Team Coast 
 Velocity eSports

2014 Spring 
 Cloud9
 Team SoloMid 
 Counter Logic Gaming
 Team Dignitas 
 Team Curse
 Team Coast 
 Evil Geniuses
 XDG Gaming

2014 Summer 
 Cloud9
 LMQ
 Team SoloMid
 Team Curse
 Counter Logic Gaming
 Team Dignitas
 Evil Geniuses 
 compLexity Gaming

2015 Spring 
 Team SoloMid
 Cloud9
 Counter Logic Gaming 
 Team Impulse
 Gravity Gaming
 Team Liquid
 Team 8
 Winterfox 
 Team Dignitas
 Team Coast

2015 Summer 
 Team Liquid
 Counter Logic Gaming 
 Team Impulse
 Gravity Gaming
 Team SoloMid
 Team Dignitas
 Cloud9
 Team 8
 Enemy eSports
 Team Dragon Knights

2016 Spring 
 Immortals
 Counter Logic Gaming
 Cloud9
 Team Liquid
 NRG Esports
 Team SoloMid
 Echo Fox
 Renegades
 Team Impulse
 Team Dignitas

2016 Summer 
 Immortals
 Counter Logic Gaming 
 Cloud9
 Team Liquid 
 NRG Esports
 Team SoloMid
 Echo Fox
 Team Envy
 Phoenix1
 Apex Gaming

2017 Spring 
 Cloud9
 Counter Logic Gaming
 Echo Fox
 FlyQuest
 Immortals
 Phoenix1
 Team Dignitas
 Team Envy
 Team Liquid 
 Team SoloMid

2017 Summer 
 Cloud9
 Counter Logic Gaming
 Echo Fox
 FlyQuest
 Immortals
 Phoenix1
 Team Dignitas
 Team Envy
 Team Liquid 
 Team SoloMid

Franchise teams

2018 Spring – 2019 Summer 
 100 Thieves (Cleveland Cavaliers)
 Cloud9
 Clutch Gaming (Houston Rockets)
 Counter Logic Gaming
 Echo Fox
 FlyQuest
 Golden Guardians (Golden State Warriors)
 OpTic Gaming
 Team Liquid 
 Team SoloMid

2020 Spring onwards 
 100 Thieves (Cleveland Cavaliers)
 Cloud9
 Counter Logic Gaming
 Dignitas
 Evil Geniuses
 FlyQuest
 Golden Guardians (Golden State Warriors)
 Immortals
 Team Liquid 
 Team SoloMid

References

 
League of Legends Championship Series teams